Kirkwood is an unincorporated community located within Voorhees Township in Camden County, New Jersey, United States. Kirkwood once had a post office assigned United States Postal Service ZIP Code 08043. The ZIP Code has been reassigned to a post office named Voorhees that serves the entire township. Kirkwood is still a valid city name for mailing purposes.

Kirkwood developed as a bungalow community of homes near Kirkwood Lake, an impoundment of the Cooper River. Residents of nearby Philadelphia and Camden enjoyed Kirkwood as a summer escape from the cities, and many Kirkwood homes were originally Sears-Roebuck catalogue houses built as vacation homes. Most of the early homes were built in the 1915-1925 period.

As of the 2000 United States Census, the population for ZIP Code Tabulation Area 08043 was 28,126.

References

External links
Census 2000 Fact Sheet for Zip Code Tabulation Area 08043 from the United States Census Bureau

Voorhees Township, New Jersey
Unincorporated communities in Camden County, New Jersey
Unincorporated communities in New Jersey